The Mill River is a stream in the Town of Hempstead in Nassau County, on the South Shore of Long Island, in New York, United States.

Description 
The Mill River runs between West Hempstead, just south of Hempstead Turnpike (New York State Route 24), and Hewlett Bay. The waters flow towards the south and ultimately into Hewlett Bay.

Communities which the Mill River passes through include Lynbrook, Rockville Centre, and West Hempstead.

Another Mill River exists on Long Island, located in the Town of Oyster Bay on the North Shore.

Mill River Watershed 
The Mill River Watershed is a watershed which drains into the Mill River and ultimately into Hewlett Bay. It stretches from the North Shore down to the bay. Hempstead Lake (located in Hempstead Lake State Park) is a sub-watershed of the Mill River Watershed, as the water from Hempstead Lake flows into the Mill River, via. South Pond and Smith Lake.

Notable communities either partially or wholly within the Mill River Watershed include East Hills, East Rockaway, Garden City, Hempstead, Lakeview, Malverne, Mineola, Oceanside, Old Westbury, Rockville Centre, Roslyn Estates, Roslyn Heights, and West Hempstead.

See also 
 Carmans River – Another north-south river on Long Island.
Connetquot River – Another north-south river on Long Island.
Motts Creek – An adjacent north-south river on Long Island, located slightly to the west.

References 

Hempstead, New York
Rivers of New York (state)